Oak Lawn is a historic home located at Charlottesville, Virginia. The brick dwelling was built in 1822, and consists of a two-story, four bay, main block flanked by one-story, two bay wings. The central section has a front gable roof and one-story porch with a flat roof supported by four Tuscan order columns and topped by a second story balcony. Exterior chimneys arise between the main block and each of the wings. Also on the property are a contributing kitchen (1822) and two cemeteries. It was built by James Dinsmore, a Scots-Irish builder who worked for Thomas Jefferson.

It was listed on the National Register of Historic Places in 1973. It is located in the Fifeville and Tonsler Neighborhoods Historic District.

References

Houses on the National Register of Historic Places in Virginia
Houses completed in 1822
Houses in Charlottesville, Virginia
National Register of Historic Places in Charlottesville, Virginia
Historic district contributing properties in Virginia
1822 establishments in Virginia